A  is a structure whose main purpose is to house ("enshrine") one or more kami, the deities of the Shinto religion.

Overview 
Structurally, a Shinto shrine typically comprises several buildings. 

The honden (本殿, meaning: "main hall") is where a shrine's patron kami is/are enshrined. The honden may be absent in cases where a shrine stands on or near a sacred mountain, tree, or other object which can be worshipped directly or in cases where a shrine possesses either an altar-like structure, called a himorogi, or an object believed to be capable of attracting spirits, called a yorishiro, which can also serve as direct bonds to a kami.

Although only one word ("shrine") is used in English, in Japanese, Shinto shrines may carry any one of many different, non-equivalent names like gongen, -gū, jinja, jingū, mori, myōjin, -sha, taisha, ubusuna or yashiro. Miniature shrines (hokora) can occasionally be found on roadsides. Mikoshi, the palanquins which are carried on poles during festivals (matsuri), also enshrine kami and are therefore considered shrines.

This work listed all of the 2,861 Shinto shrines existing at the time, and the 3,131 official-recognized and enshrined kami. Some shrines, such as the Yasukuni Shrine, are totally independent of any outside authority. The number of Shinto shrines in Japan is estimated to be around 100,000.

Since ancient times, the Shake (社家) families dominated Shinto shrines through hereditary positions, and at some shrines the hereditary succession continues to present day.

History

Early origins 

Ancestors are kami to be worshipped. Yayoi period village councils sought the advice of ancestors and other kami, and developed instruments, to evoke them. Yoshishiro means "approach substitute" and were conceived to attract the kami to allow them physical space, thus making kami accessible to human beings.

Village council sessions were held in quiet spots in the mountains or in forests near great trees or other natural objects that served as yorishiro. These sacred places and their yorishiro gradually evolved into today's shrines, whose origins can be still seen in the Japanese words for "mountain" and "forest", which can also mean "shrine". Many shrines have on their grounds one of the original great yorishiro: a big tree, surrounded by a sacred rope called .

The first buildings at places dedicated to worship were hut-like structures built to house some yorishiro. A trace of this origin can be found in the term , "deity storehouse", which evolved into hokora (written with the same characters 神庫), and is considered to be one of the first words for shrine.

First temporary shrines
True shrines arose with the beginning of agriculture, when the need arose to attract kami to ensure good harvests. These were, however, just temporary structures built for a particular purpose, a tradition of which traces can be found in some rituals.

Hints of the first shrines can still be found. Ōmiwa Shrine in Nara, for example, contains no sacred images or objects because it is believed to serve the mountain on which it stands—images or objects are therefore unnecessary. Archeology confirms that, during the Yayoi period, the most common  (a yorishiro actually housing the enshrined kami) in the earliest shrines were nearby mountain peaks that supplied stream water to the plains where people lived. Besides the already mentioned Ōmiwa Shrine, another important example is Mount Nantai, a phallus-shaped mountain in Nikko which constitutes Futarasan Shrine's shintai. The name  means "man's body". The mountain provides water to the rice paddies below and has the shape of the phallic stone rods found in pre-agricultural Jōmon sites.

First known shrine 
The first known Shinto shrine was built in roughly 478.

Rites and ceremonies

In 905 CE, Emperor Daigo ordered a compilation of Shinto rites and rules.  Previous attempts at codification are known to have taken place, but, neither the Konin nor the Jogan Gishiki survive.  Initially under the direction of Fujiwara no Tokihira, the project stalled at his death in April 909. Fujiwara no Tadahira, his brother, took charge and in 912 and in 927 the Engi-shiki (延喜式, literally: "Procedures of the Engi Era") was promulgated in fifty volumes.  This, the first formal codification of Shinto rites and Norito (liturgies and prayers) to survive, became the basis for all subsequent Shinto liturgical practice and efforts. In addition to the first ten volumes of this fifty volume work (which concerned worship and the Department of Worship), sections in subsequent volumes addressing the Ministry of Ceremonies (治部省) and the Ministry of the Imperial Household (宮内省) also regulated Shinto worship and contained liturgical rites and regulation. Felicia Gressitt Brock published a two-volume annotated English language translation of the first ten volumes with an introduction entitled Engi-shiki; procedures of the Engi Era in 1970.

Arrival and influence of Buddhism

The arrival of Buddhism in Japan in around the sixth century introduced the concept of a permanent shrine. A great number of Buddhist temples were built next to existing shrines in mixed complexes called  to help priesthood deal with local kami, making those shrines permanent. Some time in their evolution, the word , meaning "palace", came into use indicating that shrines had by then become the imposing structures of today.

Once the first permanent shrines were built, Shinto revealed a strong tendency to resist architectural change, a tendency which manifested itself in the so-called , the tradition of rebuilding shrines faithfully at regular intervals adhering strictly to their original design. This custom is the reason ancient styles have been replicated throughout the centuries to the present day, remaining more or less intact. Ise Grand Shrine, still rebuilt every 20 years, is its best extant example. In Shinto it has played a particularly significant role in preserving ancient architectural styles. Izumo Taisha, Sumiyoshi Taisha, and Nishina Shinmei Shrine in fact represent each a different style whose origin is believed to predate Buddhism in Japan. These three styles are known respectively as taisha-zukuri, sumiyoshi-zukuri, and shinmei-zukuri.

Shrines show various influences, particularly that of Buddhism, a cultural import which provided much of Shinto architecture's vocabulary.

Shinbutsu shūgō and the jingūji

Until the Meiji period (1868–1912), shrines as they are today were rare. With very few exceptions like Ise Grand Shrine and Izumo Taisha, they were just a part of a temple-shrine complex controlled by Buddhist clergy. These complexes were called  , places of worship composed of a Buddhist temple and of a shrine dedicated to a local kami. The complexes were born when a temple was erected next to a shrine to help its kami with its karmic problems. At the time, kami were thought to be also subjected to karma, and therefore in need of a salvation only Buddhism could provide. Having first appeared during the Nara period (710–794), the jingū-ji remained common for over a millennium until, with few exceptions, they were destroyed in compliance with the new policies of the Meiji administration in 1868.

Shinbutsu bunri

This event triggered the haibutsu kishaku, a violent anti-Buddhist movement which in the final years of the Tokugawa shogunate and during the Meiji Restoration caused the forcible closure of thousands of Buddhist temples, the confiscation of their land, the forced return to lay life of monks, and the destruction of books, statues and other Buddhist property.

Until the end of Edo period, local kami beliefs and Buddhism were intimately connected in what was called shinbutsu shūgō (神仏習合), up to the point where even the same buildings were used as both Shinto shrines and Buddhist temples.

After the law, the two would be forcibly separated. This was done in several stages. At first an order issued by the Jingijimuka in April 1868 ordered the defrocking of shasō and bettō (shrine monks performing Buddhist rites at Shinto shrines). A few days later, the 'Daijōkan' banned the application of Buddhist terminology such as gongen to Japanese kami and the veneration of Buddhist statues in shrines. The third stage consisted of the prohibition against applying the Buddhist term Daibosatsu (Great Bodhisattva) to the syncretic kami Hachiman at the Iwashimizu Hachiman-gū and Usa Hachiman-gū shrines. In the fourth and final stage, all the defrocked bettō and shasō were told to become "shrine priests" (kannushi) and return to their shrines. In addition, monks of the Nichiren sect were told not to refer to some deities as kami.

After a short period in which it enjoyed popular favor, the process of separation of Buddhas and kami however stalled and is still only partially completed. To this day, almost all Buddhist temples in Japan have a small shrine (chinjusha) dedicated to its Shinto tutelary kami, and vice versa Buddhist figures (e.g. goddess Kannon) are revered in Shinto shrines.

Shintai

The defining features of a shrine are the kami it enshrines and the shintai (or go-shintai if the honorific prefix go- is used) that houses it.  While the name literally means "body of a kami", shintai are physical objects worshiped at or near Shinto shrines because a kami is believed to reside in them. Shintai are not themselves part of kami, but rather just symbolic repositories which make them accessible to human beings for worship; the kami inhabits them. Shintai are also of necessity yorishiro, that is objects by their very nature capable of attracting kami.

The most common shintai are objects like mirrors, swords, jewels (for example comma-shaped stones called magatama), gohei (wands used during religious rites), and sculptures of kami called , but they can be also natural objects such as rocks, mountains, trees, and waterfalls. Mountains were among the first, and are still among the most important, shintai, and are worshiped at several famous shrines. In the case of a man-made shintai, a kami must be invited to reside in it.

The founding of a new shrine requires the presence of either a pre-existing, naturally occurring shintai (for example a rock or waterfall housing a local kami), or of an artificial one, which must therefore be procured or made to the purpose. An example of the first case are the Nachi Falls, worshiped at Hiryū Shrine near Kumano Nachi Taisha and believed to be inhabited by a kami called Hiryū Gongen.

The first duty of a shrine is to house and protect its shintai and the kami which inhabits it. If a shrine has more than one building, the one containing the shintai is called honden; because it is meant for the exclusive use of the kami, it is always closed to the public and is not used for prayer or religious ceremonies. The shintai leaves the honden only during festivals (matsuri), when it is put in portable shrines (mikoshi) and carried around the streets among the faithful. The portable shrine is used to physically protect the shintai and to hide it from sight.

Re-enshrinement

Often the opening of a new shrine will require the ritual division of a kami and the transferring of one of the two resulting spirits to the new location, where it will animate the shintai. This process of propagation, described by the priests, in spite of this name, not as a division but as akin to the lighting of a candle from another already lit, leaves the original kami intact in its original place and therefore does not alter any of its properties. The resulting spirit has all the qualities of the original and is therefore "alive" and permanent. The process is used often—for example during Shinto festivals (matsuri) to animate temporary shrines called mikoshi.

The transfer does not necessarily take place from a shrine to another: the divided spirit's new location can be a privately owned object or an individual's house. The kanjō process was of fundamental importance in the creation of all of Japan's shrine networks (Inari shrines, Hachiman shrines, etc.).

Shake families 

The shake (社家) are families and the former social class that dominated Shinto shrines through hereditary positions within a shrine. The social class was abolished in 1871, but many shake families still continue hereditary succession until present day and some were appointed hereditary nobility (Kazoku) after the Meiji Restoration.

Some of the most well-known shake families include:
 Arakida and Watarai of Ise Grand Shrine
 Senge and Kitajima of Izumo Taisha
 Ōnakatomi of Kasuga Taisha
 Urabe of Yoshida Shrine

Famous shrines and shrine networks
Those worshiped at a shrine are generally Shinto kami, but sometimes they can be Buddhist or Taoist deities, as well as others not generally considered to belong to Shinto. Some shrines were established to worship living people or figures from myths and legends. An example are the Tōshō-gū shrines erected to enshrine Tokugawa Ieyasu, or the many shrines dedicated to Sugawara no Michizane, like Kitano Tenman-gū.

Often the shrines which were most significant historically do not lie in a former center of power like Kyoto, Nara, or Kamakura. For example, Ise Grand Shrine, the Imperial household's family shrine, is in Mie prefecture. Izumo-taisha, one of the oldest and most revered shrines in Japan, is in Shimane Prefecture. This is because their location is that of a traditionally important kami, and not that of temporal institutions.

The spreading of a kami can be evoked by one or more of several different mechanisms. The typical one is an operation called kanjō, a propagation process through which a kami is invited to a new location and there re-enshrined. The new shrine is administered completely independent from the one it originated from.

However, other transfer mechanisms exist. In Ise Grand Shrine's case, for example, its network of Shinmei shrines (from Shinmei, 神明; another name for Amaterasu) grew due to two concurrent causes. During the late Heian period the cult of Amaterasu, worshiped initially only at Ise Grand Shrine, started to spread to the shrine's possessions through the usual kanjō mechanism. Later, branch shrines started to appear further away. The first evidence of a Shinmei shrine far from Ise is given by the Azuma Kagami, a Kamakura-period text which refers to Amanawa Shinmei-gū's appearance in Kamakura, Kanagawa. Amaterasu began to be worshiped in other parts of the country because of the so-called  phenomenon, the belief that she would fly to other locations and settle there. Similar mechanisms have been responsible for the spreading around the country of other kami.

Notable shrines

The Ise Grand Shrine in Mie prefecture is, with Izumo-taisha, the most representative and historically significant shrine in Japan. The kami the two enshrine play fundamental roles in the Kojiki and Nihon Shoki, two texts of great importance to Shinto. Because its kami, Amaterasu, is an ancestor of the Emperor, Ise Grand Shrine is the Imperial Household's family shrine. Ise Grand Shrine is, however, dedicated specifically to the Emperor and in the past, even his mother, wife and grandmother needed his permission to worship there. Its traditional and mythological foundation date goes back to 4 BC, but historians believe it was founded around the 3rd to 5th century AD.

Izumo Taisha in Shimane Prefecture is so old that no document about its origin survives, and the year of foundation is unknown. The shrine is the center of a series of sagas and myths. The kami it enshrines, Ōkuninushi, created Japan before it was populated by Amaterasu's offspring, the Emperor's ancestors. Because of its physical remoteness, in historical times Izumo has been eclipsed in fame by other sites, but there is still a widespread belief that in October all Japanese gods meet there.

Fushimi Inari Taisha is the head shrine of the largest shrine network in Japan, which has more than 32,000 members (about a third of the total). Inari Okami worship started here in the 8th century and has continued ever since, expanding to the rest of the country. Located in Fushimi-ku, Kyoto, the shrine sits at the base of a mountain also named Inari, and includes trails up the mountain to many smaller shrines. Another very large example is the Yūtoku Inari Shrine in Kashima City, Saga Prefecture.

Ōita Prefecture's Usa Shrine (called in Japanese Usa Jingū or Usa Hachiman-gū) is, together with Iwashimizu Hachiman-gū, the head of the Hachiman shrine network. Hachiman worship started here at least as far back as the Nara period (710–794). In the year 860, the kami was divided and brought to Iwashimizu Hachiman-gū in Kyoto, which became the focus of Hachiman worship in the capital. Located on top of Mount Otokoyama, Usa Hachiman-gū is dedicated to Emperor Ōjin, his mother Empress Jingū, and female kami Hime no Okami.

Itsukushima Shrine is, together with Munakata Taisha, at the head of the Munakata shrine network. Remembered for its torii raising from the waters, it is a UNESCO World Heritage Site. The shrine is dedicated to the three daughters of Susano-o no Mikoto,  kami of seas and storms and brother of the great sun kami.

Kasuga Taisha is a Shinto shrine in the city of Nara, in Nara Prefecture, Japan. Established in 768 AD and rebuilt several times over the centuries, it is the shrine of the Fujiwara family.  The interior is noted for its many bronze lanterns, as well as the many stone lanterns that lead up the shrine. The architectural style Kasuga-zukuri takes its name from Kasuga Taisha's honden.

The Kumano Sanzan shrine complex, head of the Kumano shrine network, includes Kumano Hayatama Taisha (Wakayama Prefecture, Shingu), Kumano Hongu Taisha (Wakayama Prefecture, Tanabe), and Kumano Nachi Taisha (Wakayama Prefecture, Nachikatsuura). The shrines lie between 20 and 40 km one from the other. The great Kumano Sanzan complex also includes two Buddhist temples, Seiganto-ji and Fudarakusan-ji.

The religious significance of the Kumano region goes back to prehistoric times, and predates all modern religions in Japan. The area was, and still is, considered a place of physical healing.

Yasukuni shrine, in Tokyo, is dedicated to the soldiers and others who died fighting on behalf of the Emperor of Japan.

Shrine networks
There are estimated to be around 80,000 shrines in Japan. The majority of Shinto shrines are associated with a shrine network. This counts only shrines with resident priests; if smaller shrines (such as roadside or household shrines) are included, the number would be double. These are highly concentrated; over one-third are associated with Inari (over 30,000 shrines), and the top six networks comprise over 90% of all shrines, though there are at least 20 networks with over 200 shrines.

The next ten largest networks contain between 2,000 branches down to about 200 branches, and include the networks headed by Matsunoo-taisha, Kibune Shrine, and Taga-taisha, among others.

Inari shrines

The number of branch shrines gives an approximate indication of their religious significance, and neither Ise Grand Shrine nor Izumo-taisha can claim the first place. By far the most numerous are shrines dedicated to Inari, tutelary kami of agriculture popular all over Japan, which alone constitute almost a third of the total. Inari protects fishing, commerce, and productivity in general. Many modern Japanese corporations have shrines dedicated to Inari on their premises. Inari shrines are usually very small and easy to maintain, but can be very large, as in the case of Fushimi Inari Taisha, the head shrine of the network. The kami is enshrined in some Buddhist temples.

The entrance to an Inari shrine is usually marked by one or more vermilion torii and two white foxes. This red color has come to be identified with Inari because of the prevalence of its use among Inari shrines and their torii. The kitsune statues are at times mistakenly believed to be a form assumed by Inari, and they typically come in pairs, representing a male and a female, although sex is usually not obvious. These fox statues hold a symbolic item in their mouths or beneath a front paw – most often a jewel and a key, but a sheaf of rice, a scroll, or a fox cub are common. Almost all Inari shrines, no matter how small, will feature at least a pair of these statues, usually flanking, on the altar, or in front of the main sanctuary.

Hachiman shrines

A syncretic entity worshiped as both a kami and a Buddhist daibosatsu, Hachiman is intimately associated with both learning and warriors. In the sixth or seventh century, Emperor Ōjin and his mother Empress Jingū came to be identified together with Hachiman. First enshrined at Usa Hachiman-gū in Ōita Prefecture, Hachiman was deeply revered during the Heian period. According to the Kojiki, it was Ōjin who invited Korean and Chinese scholars to Japan, and for this reason he is the patron of writing and learning.

After Minamoto no Yoritomo became shōgun and established the Kamakura shogunate, Hachiman's popularity grew and he became by extension the protector of the warrior class the shōgun had brought to power. For this reason, the shintai of a Hachiman shrine is usually a stirrup or a bow.

During the Japanese medieval period, Hachiman worship spread throughout Japan among samurai and the peasantry. There are 25,000 shrines in Japan dedicated to him, the second most numerous after those of the Inari network. Usa Hachiman-gū is the network's head shrine together with Iwashimizu Hachiman-gū. However, Hakozaki Shrine and Tsurugaoka Hachiman-gū are historically no less significant shrines, and are more popular.

Munakata shrines
The same three kami are enshrined elsewhere in the network, sometimes under a different name. However, while Munakata Taisha enshrines all three in separate islands belonging to its complex, branch shrines generally do not; which kami they enshrine depends on the history of the shrine and the myths tied to it.

Tenjin shrines

The Tenjin shrine network enshrines 9th-century scholar Sugawara no Michizane. Sugawara had originally been enshrined to placate his spirit, not to be worshiped. Michizane had been unjustly exiled in his life, and it was necessary to somehow placate his rage, believed to be the cause of a plague and other disasters. Kitano Tenman-gū was the first of the shrines dedicated to him. Because in life he was a scholar, he became the kami of learning, and during the Edo period schools often opened a branch shrine for him. Another important shrine dedicated to him is Dazaifu Tenman-gū.

Shinmei shrines
While the ritsuryō legal system was in use, visits by commoners to Ise were forbidden. With its weakening during the Heian period, commoners started being allowed in the shrine. The growth of the Shinmei shrine network was due to two concomitant causes. During the late Heian period, goddess Amaterasu, worshiped initially only at Ise Grand Shrine, started to be re-enshrined in branch shrines in Ise's own possessions through the typical kanjō mechanism. The first evidence of a Shinmei shrine elsewhere is given by the Azuma Kagami, a Kamakura period text which refers to Amanawa Shinmei-gū's appearance in Kamakura. Amaterasu spread to other parts of the country because of the so-called  phenomenon, the belief that Amaterasu flew to other locations and settled there.

Kumano shrines

Kumano shrines enshrine the three Kumano mountains: Hongū, Shingū, and Nachi (the ).  The point of origin of the Kumano cult is the Kumano Sanzan shrine complex, which includes  (Wakayama Prefecture, Shingu), Kumano Hongu Taisha (Wakayama Prefecture, Tanabe), and Kumano Nachi Taisha (Wakayama Prefecture, Nachikatsuura). There are more than 3,000 Kumano shrines in Japan.

Structure

The following is a list and diagram illustrating the most important parts of a Shinto shrine:
Torii – Shinto gate
Stone stairs
Sandō – the approach to the shrine
Chōzuya or temizuya – place of purification to cleanse one's hands and mouth
Tōrō – decorative stone lanterns
Kagura-den – building dedicated to Noh or the sacred kagura dance
Shamusho – the shrine's administrative office
Ema – wooden plaques bearing prayers or wishes
[[Setsumatsusha|Sessha/massha]] – small auxiliary shrines
Komainu – the so-called "lion dogs", guardians of the shrine
Haiden – oratory or hall of worship
Tamagaki – fence surrounding the honden
Honden – main hall, enshrining the kami
On the roof of the haiden and honden are visible chigi (forked roof finials) and katsuogi (short horizontal logs), both common shrine ornamentations.

The general blueprint of a Shinto shrine is Buddhist in origin. The presence of verandas, stone lanterns, and elaborate gates is an example of this influence. The composition of a Shinto shrine is extremely variable, and none of its many possible features is necessarily present. Even the honden can be missing if the shrine worships a nearby natural shintai.

However, since its grounds are sacred, they are usually surrounded by a fence made of stone or wood called tamagaki, while access is made possible by an approach called sandō. The entrances themselves are straddled by gates called torii, which are usually the simplest way to identify a Shinto shrine.

A shrine may include within its grounds several structures, each built for a different purpose. Among them are the  honden or sanctuaries, where the kami are enshrined,  the heiden or hall of offerings, where offers and prayers are presented, and the haiden or hall of worship, where there may be seats for worshippers. The honden is the building that contains the shintai, literally, "the sacred body of the kami". Of these, only the haiden is open to the laity. The honden is usually located behind the haiden and is often much smaller and unadorned. Buildings are often adorned by chigi and katsuogi, variously oriented poles which protrude from their roof.

Before the Meiji Restoration it was common for a Buddhist temple to be built inside or next to a shrine, or vice versa. Analogously, temples all over Japan adopted  and built  to house them. After the forcible separation of Buddhist temples and Shinto shrines (shinbutsu bunri) ordered by the new government in the Meiji period, the connection between the two religions was officially severed, but continued nonetheless in practice and is still visible today.

Architectural styles

Shrine buildings can have many different basic layouts, usually named either after a famous shrine's honden (e.g. hiyoshi-zukuri, named after Hiyoshi Taisha), or a structural characteristic (e.g. irimoya-zukuri, after the hip-and gable roof it adopts. The suffix -zukuri in this case means "structure".)

The hondens roof is always gabled, and some styles have a veranda-like aisle called hisashi (a 1-ken wide corridor surrounding one or more sides of the core of a shrine or temple).
Among the factors involved in the classification, important are the presence or absence of:
 – a style of construction in which the building has its main entrance on the side which runs parallel to the roof's ridge (non gabled-side). The shinmei-zukuri, nagare-zukuri, hachiman-zukuri, and hie-zukuri belong to this type.
 – a style of construction in which the building has its main entrance on the side which runs perpendicular to the roof's ridge (gabled side). The taisha-zukuri, sumiyoshi-zukuri, ōtori-zukuri and kasuga-zukuri belong to this type.

Proportions are important. A building of a given style often must have certain proportions measured in ken (the distance between pillars, a quantity variable from one shrine to another or even within the same shrine).

The oldest styles are the tsumairi shinmei-zukuri, taisha-zukuri, and sumiyoshi-zukuri, believed to predate the arrival of Buddhism.

The two most common are the hirairi nagare-zukuri and the tsumairi kasuga-zukuri. Larger, more important shrines tend to have unique styles.

Most common styles
The following are the two most common shrine styles in Japan.

Nagare-zukuri

This is the feature which gives the style its name, the most common among shrines all over the country. Sometimes the basic layout consisting of an elevated  partially surrounded by a veranda called hisashi (all under the same roof) is modified by the addition of a room in front of the entrance. The honden varies in roof ridge length from 1 to 11 ken, but is never 6 or 8 ken. The most common sizes are 1 and 3 ken. The oldest shrine in Japan, Uji's Ujigami Shrine, has a honden of this type. Its external dimensions are 5×3 ken, but internally it is composed of three  measuring 1 ken each.

Kasuga-zukuri
 as a style takes its name from Kasuga Taisha's honden. It is characterized by the extreme smallness of the building, just 1×1 ken in size. In Kasuga Taisha's case, this translates in 1.9 m × 2.6 m. The roof is gabled with a single entrance at the gabled end, decorated with chigi and katsuogi, covered with cypress bark and curved upwards at the eaves. Supporting structures are painted vermillion, while the plank walls are white.

After the Nagare-zukuri, this is the most common style, with most instances in the Kansai region around Nara.

Styles predating the arrival of Buddhism

The following four styles predate the arrival in Japan of Buddhism:

Primitive shrine layout with no honden
It is unique in that the honden, is missing. It is believed shrines of this type are reminiscent of what shrines were like in prehistorical times. The first shrines had no honden because the shintai, or object of worship, was the mountain on which they stood. An extant example is Nara's Ōmiwa Shrine, which still has no honden. An area near the haiden (hall of worship), sacred and taboo, replaces it for worship. Another prominent example of this style is Futarasan Shrine near Nikkō, whose shintai is Mount Nantai.

Shinmei-zukuri

 is an ancient style typical of, and most common at, Ise Grand Shrine, the holiest of Shinto shrines. It is most common in Mie prefecture. Characterized by an extreme simplicity, its basic features can be seen in Japanese architecture from the Kofun period (250–538 CE) onwards and it is considered the pinnacle of Japanese traditional architecture. Built in planed, unfinished wood, the honden is either 3×2 ken or 1×1 ken in size, has a raised floor, a gabled roof with an entry on one of the non-gabled sides, no upward curve at the eaves, and decorative logs called chigi and katsuogi protruding from the roof's ridge. The oldest extant example is Nishina Shinmei Shrine.

Sumiyoshi-zukuri

 takes its name from Sumiyoshi Taisha's honden in Ōsaka. The building is 4 ken wide and 2 ken deep, and has an entrance under the gable. Construction is simple, but the pillars are painted in vermilion and the walls in white.

The style is supposed to have its origin in old palace architecture. Another example of this style is Sumiyoshi Jinja, part of the Sumiyoshi Sanjin complex in Fukuoka Prefecture. In both cases, as in many others, there is no veranda.

Taisha-zukuri

 is the oldest shrine style, takes its name from Izumo Taisha and, like Ise Grand Shrine's, has chigi and katsuogi, plus archaic features like gable-end pillars and a single central pillar (shin no mihashira). Because its floor is raised on stilts, it is believed to have its origin in raised-floor granaries similar to those found in Toro, Shizuoka prefecture.

The honden normally has a 2×2 ken footprint (12.46 × 12.46 m in Izumo Taisha's case), with an entrance on the gabled end. The stairs to the honden are covered by a cypress bark roof. The oldest extant example of the style is Kamosu Jinja's honden in Shimane Prefecture, built in the 16th century.

Other styles
Many other architectural styles exist, most of them rare.

Interpreting shrine names

Shrine nomenclature has changed considerably since the Meiji period. Until then, the vast majority of shrines were small and had no permanent priest. With very few exceptions, they were just a part of a temple-shrine complex controlled by Buddhist clergy. The term , now the most common, was rare. Examples of this kind of pre-Meiji use are Tokusō Daigongen and Kanda Myōjin.

Today, the term "Shinto shrine" in English is used in opposition to "Buddhist temple" to mirror in English the distinction made in Japanese between Shinto and Buddhist religious structures.

Shrine names are descriptive, and a difficult problem in dealing with them is understanding exactly what they mean. Although there is a lot of variation in their composition, it is usually possible to identify in them two parts.

Meishō
The most common meishō is the location where the shrine stands, as for example in the case of Ise Jingū, the most sacred of shrines, which is located in the city of Ise, Mie prefecture.

Very often the meishō will be the name of the kami enshrined. An Inari Shrine for example is a shrine dedicated to kami Inari. Analogously, a Kumano Shrine is a shrine that enshrines the three Kumano mountains. A Hachiman Shrine enshrines kami Hachiman. Tokyo's Meiji Shrine enshrines the Meiji Emperor. The name can also have other origins, often unknown or unclear.

Shōgō
The second part of the name defines the status of the shrine.
  is the most general name for shrine. These two characters used to be read either "kamu-tsu-yashiro" or "mori", both meaning "kami grove". Both readings can be found for example in the Man'yōshū.
  is a generic term for shinto shrine like jinja.
 A  is a place where a kami is present. It can therefore be a shrine and, in fact, the characters 神社, 社 and 杜 can all be read "mori" ("grove"). This reading reflects the fact the first shrines were simply sacred groves or forests where kami were present.
 The suffix , as in Shinmei-sha or Tenjin-ja, indicates a minor shrine that has received through the kanjō process a kami from a more important one.
  is an extremely small shrine of the kind one finds for example along country roads.
  is a shrine of particularly high status that has a deep relationship with the Imperial household or enshrines an Emperor, as for example in the case of the Ise Jingū and the Meiji Jingū. The name Jingū alone, however, can refer only to the Ise Jingū, whose official name is just "Jingū".
  indicates a shrine enshrining a special kami or a member of the Imperial household like the Empress, but there are many examples in which it is used simply as a tradition. During the period of state regulation, many -miya names were changed to jinja.
  indicates a shrine enshrining an imperial prince, but there are many examples in which it is used simply as a tradition.
Many shrines carrying that shōgō adopted it only after the war.
 During the Japanese Middle Ages, shrines started being called with the name gongen, a term of Buddhist origin. For example, in Eastern Japan there are still many Hakusan shrines where the shrine itself is called  gongen.

These names are not equivalent in terms of prestige: a taisha is more prestigious than a -gū, which in turn is more important than a jinja.

Shrines with structures designated as National Treasures

Shrines that are part of a World Heritage Site are marked with a dagger.
 Tōhoku region
 Ōsaki Hachiman Shrine (Sendai, Miyagi)
Kantō region
Nikkō Tōshō-gū (Nikkō, Tochigi)
Rinnō-ji (Nikkō, Tochigi)
Chūbu region
 Nishina Shinmei Shrine (Ōmachi, Nagano)
Kansai region
Onjō-ji (Ōtsu, Shiga)
 Hiyoshi Taisha (Ōtsu, Shiga)
 Mikami Shrine (Yasu, Shiga)
 Ōsasahara Shrine (Yasu, Shiga)
 Tsukubusuma Shrine (Nagahama, Shiga)
 Namura Shrine (Ryūō, Shiga)
Kamo Shrine (Kyoto, Kyoto)
Daigo-ji (Kyoto, Kyoto)
 Toyokuni Shrine (Kyoto, Kyoto)
 Kitano Tenman-gū (Kyoto, Kyoto)
Ujigami Shrine (Uji, Kyoto)
 Sumiyoshi Taisha (Osaka, Osaka)
 Sakurai Shrine (Sakai, Osaka)
Kasuga Shrine (Nara, Nara)
 Enjō-ji (Nara, Nara)
 Isonokami Shrine (Tenri, Nara)
 Udamikumari Shrine (Uda, Nara)
Chūgoku region
Sanbutsu-ji (Misasa, Tottori)
 Izumo Taisha (Taisha, Shimane)
 Kamosu Shrine (Matsue, Shimane)
 Kibitsu Shrine (Okayama, Okayama)
Itsukushima Shrine (Hatsukaichi, Hiroshima)
 Sumiyoshi Shrine (Shimonoseki, Yamaguchi)
Shikoku region
 Kandani Shrine (Sakaide, Kagawa)
Kyūshū region
 Usa Shrine (Usa, Ōita)
 Aoi Aso Shrine (Hitoyoshi, Kumamoto)

Officiants

Kannushi

These two terms were not always synonyms. Originally, a kannushi was a holy man who could work miracles and who, thanks to purification rites, could work as an intermediary between kami and man, but later the term evolved to being synonymous with shinshoku, a man who works at a shrine and holds religious ceremonies there. Women can also become kannushi, and it is common for widows to succeed their husbands.

Miko

A  is a shrine maiden who has trained for and taken up several duties at a shrine including assistance of shrine functions such as the sale of sacred goods (including amulets known as omamori, paper talisman known as ofuda, wood tablets known as ema and among other items), daily tidying of the premises, and performing the sacred kagura dances on certain occasions.

Gallery

See also
 Dambana
 Giboshi
 Glossary of Shinto
 List of National Treasures of Japan (shrines)
 List of Shinto shrines
 Modern system of ranked Shinto shrines
 Senjafuda
 Shrine Shinto
 Twenty-Two Shrines (Nijūnisha)

Notes

Footnotes

Citations

References
 

 

 
 
 
 
 The History of Shrines, Encyclopedia of Shinto, retrieved on June 10, 2008
 Shinto Shrines or Temples?  retrieved on June 10, 2008
 Shrine Architecture Encyclopedia of Shinto, retrieved on June 10, 2008
 Overview of a Shinto Shrine, a detailed visual introduction to the structure of a Shinto shrine, Encyclopedia of Shinto retrieved on June 8, 2008
 Jinja no Shōgō ni Tsuite Oshiete Kudasai , Shinto Online Network Association, retrieved on July 2, 2008 (in Japanese)
 
 Stuart D. B. Picken. Essentials of Shinto: An Analytical Guide to Principal Teachings. Greenwood, 1994.

Further reading
 
  ; OCLC 63679956
The Herbert Offen Research Collection of the Phillips Library at the Peabody Essex Museum

External links

 Encyclopedia of Shinto, Kokugakuin University
 Jinja and Shinto, site of the Shinto Online Network Association
 Jinja Honchō, the Association of Shinto Shrines
  Kokugakuin University Shinto Jinja Database
 Shinto Shrine types 

 
Architecture in Japan